Pees may refer to:
 Dean Pees (born 1949), National Football League defensive coordinator
 The Pees, a Japanese 3-piece rock band
 Urination

See also
 Peas
 Pee (disambiguation)
 PEES, a family of thermoplastic polymers